Old Loughtonians Hockey Club is a field hockey club based at the Roding Sports Centre, Luxborough Lane in Chigwell.

Club
The club runs ten men's and five women's teams in addition to junior teams from u8s to u18s. The men's first XI play in the Division 1 South of the Men's England Hockey League. The women's first XI play in the premier division of the East Area hockey league.

History
The club was founded in 1921 after the Loughton Hockey Club had disbanded during World War I. The name Old Loughtonians referred to members of the Old Loughtonians, former pupils of Loughton School which opened in 1890. In 1963 the club opened its doors to all-comers following the demise of Old Buckwellians’ Hockey Club. Ladies teams were also created and in 1980 the club opened its new grounds at Luxborough Lane.

In 1986, the Old Loughtonians Hockey Club was the first English hockey club to own an all-weather pitch. A second sand-based pitch was completed in 1992. In 1997 the main pitch was upgraded to a water-base. This was followed by the building of a mini pitch. Old Loughtonians Hockey Club was selected as the hockey and football (5-a-side and 7-a-side) training venue for the London 2012 Olympic and Paralympic Games resulting in the conversion of the two main pitches to international waterbase standard.

Honours

Men

Outdoor
1986-87 National Inter League Championship Runner-Up
1993-94 HA Cup Runner-Up
1995-96 HA Cup Runner-Up
1999-00 EHA Cup Runner-Up
2002-03 National League Division 1 
2016-17 East Premier A Division 
2021-22 England Hockey Conference East

Indoor
1994-95 National Indoor Championships Champions
1995-96 National Indoor Championships Champions 
1999-2000 Premier League Champions

Women
Outdoor
2004-05 Premier 2 League Champions

References

English field hockey clubs
Field hockey clubs established in 1921
1921 establishments in England